SSAT is an abbreviation for:
Secondary School Admission Test, a set of tests for admission to private primary and secondary schools in the US
SSAT (The Schools Network), an educational network based in the UK
Swedish Scholastic Aptitude Test, a standardized test for admission to higher education in Sweden
Social Security Appeals Tribunal, a former agency of the government of Australia